Ivan Mikhaylovich Slutsky (born January 4, 1997), also credited as Slutskii, is a Russian professional basketball player.

Playing career 
Slutsky played for the Khimki B team. Also, he previously played for their cadet and junior team.

On August 23, 2017, Slutsky signed a multi-year deal with Serbian club FMP. He is the first ever Russian player to join FMP. He made his Adriatic League debut for FMP on February 5, 2018, in a game against the Crvena zvezda mts where he played 10 minutes and scored 2 points. He left the team in August 2018.

International career 
Slutsky was a member of the Russia national under-16 and under-18 team.

See also 
 List of foreign basketball players in Serbia

References

External links
Player Profile at realgm.com
Player Profile at aba-liga.com

1997 births
Living people
ABA League players
Basketball League of Serbia players
KK FMP players
KK Metalac Valjevo players
Russian expatriate basketball people in Serbia
Russian men's basketball players
Basketball players from Moscow
Small forwards
Shooting guards